Hydnellum cristatum is a tooth fungus in the family Bankeraceae found in Europe and North America. It was originally described as a species of Hydnum by Italian mycologist Giacomo Bresadola in 1902. Joost Stalpers transferred it to the genus Hydnellum in 1993.

References

External links
 

Fungi described in 1902
Fungi of Europe
Fungi of North America
Inedible fungi
cristatum